The Macedonian bee (Apis mellifera macedonica or Apis mellifera rodopica) is a subspecies of the Western honey bee. It is found mainly in Bulgaria, North Macedonia, Northern Greece and other places in the Balkans as well. Originally this subspecies was described based on morphological characteristics by Friedrich Ruttner, as were the adami, cecropia and cypria subspecies.

The bee populations of Thrace, Macedonia, Central Greece and the Peloponnese are completely distinguishable from those on the island of Crete. Studies of bee populations in 2005 from various areas of Greece (Ikaria, Kasos, Kythira, Phthiotis, Macedonia) and Cyprus analyzing mitochondrial DNA segments and finding differences in enzymatic restrictions, resulting in Apis mellifera adami, Apis mellifera cecropia and Apis mellifera cypria having a haplotype which differs from the Macedonian Apis mellifera haplotype, this subspecies being the most distant of all.

Non-recognition of the Ruttner hypothesis 
Ruttner distinguished A. m. macedonica from A. m. carnica in 1988, assigning a geographical distribution to the subspecies in northern Greece, Bulgaria, Romania and (perhaps) part of the former USSR. Other naturalists recognize Ruttner's subspecies as A. m. rodopica and A. m. carpatica.

References

Bibliography

External links 
 ANERCEA, apicultural society website (in French)

mellifera macedonica
Western honey bee breeds
Hymenoptera of Europe
Insects described in 1988